The Alexander Hodge Memorial is an outdoor 1908 stone monument, installed in Sam Houston Park, Houston, in the U.S. state of Texas. The memorial, dedicated in 1912, was erected by the Lady Washington Chapter of the Daughters of the American Revolution to recognize Hodge as "a hero of two republics".

See also

 List of public art in Houston

References

1908 sculptures
1912 establishments in Texas
Monuments and memorials in Texas
Outdoor sculptures in Houston
Stone sculptures in Texas